The Cold Spring Canyon Arch Bridge in the Santa Ynez Mountains links Santa Barbara, California with Santa Ynez, California. The bridge is signed as part of State Route 154.

It is currently the highest arch bridge in the U.S. state of California and among the highest bridges in the United States. The bridge is also the largest steel arch bridge in the state. It was determined to be eligible for the National Register of Historic Places with exceptional significance.

History
The current bridge was completed and opened to traffic in February 1964.  It was constructed by U.S Steel Corp's American Bridge division and Massman Construction Co.  The structure won awards for engineering, design, and beauty. It was in the top 5 longest span arch bridges of this "supported deck" type in the world until the 1990s.

Cold Spring Tavern, originally a stagecoach stop, is approximately 600m south of the bridge's west base in the canyon below, on a stub of Old San Marcos Pass Road (now named Stagecoach Rd.) connecting with SR 154 at Camino Cielo and Paradise Roads.

The bridge was designated as a Historic Civil Engineering Landmark by the American Society of Civil Engineers in 1976.

Seismic retrofitting was completed in 1998 by American Bridge, one of the companies involved in the original construction.

Barriers
, the bridge had been the site of 55 suicides since its completion, which is about one per year on average; however, some years have several more suicides, such as the eight deaths recorded in 2009. The fence cost $3.2 million. A Santa Monica man committed suicide from the bridge six months later in September 2012. The most recent suicide was in April 2019; Daniel Lacy was the son of actress Julia Duffy.

Gallery

See also
Gaviota Pass
List of bridges documented by the Historic American Engineering Record in California

Suicide bridge

References

External links

Cold Spring Bridge, dot.ca.gov, retrieved on 2007-01-31.
List of Awards "Highways and Roads" (CA DOT CalHwyIndex.pdf), pg. 28

"Fatal Attraction - Cold Spring Toll Hits 47", EdHat.com, November 28, 2008
Buckland & Taylor Ltd..com: Seismic retrofit in 1999 
2008 Flickr.com: Aerial photo 

Road bridges in California
Transportation buildings and structures in Santa Barbara County, California
Open-spandrel deck arch bridges in the United States
Steel bridges in the United States
Santa Ynez Mountains
Bridges completed in 1963
1963 establishments in California
Historic American Engineering Record in California
Historic Civil Engineering Landmarks